Moussa Diawara (born 15 October 1994) is a Guinean footballer who plays as a winger for Bank El Ahly and the Guinea national team.

Playing career
Diawara began his career with Stade Malien and Kaloum in his native Guinea. He moved to Egypt and signed with El Entag El Harby, before joining Bank El Ahly on 2 November 2020.

International career
Haba made his debut with the Guinea national team in a 3–1 2016 African Nations Championship qualification win over Liberia on 22 June 2016.

References

External links
 
 
 

1994 births
Living people
People from Kindia
Guinean footballers
Guinea international footballers
Association football wingers
Stade Malien players
AS Kaloum Star players
Guinée Championnat National players
Egyptian Premier League players
Guinean expatriate footballers
Guinean expatriate sportspeople in Egypt
Expatriate footballers in Egypt
Guinea A' international footballers
2016 African Nations Championship players
Guinean expatriate sportspeople in Mali
Expatriate footballers in Mali